Gotawa is a village/town in Allahabad, Uttar Pradesh, India.

References

Villages in Allahabad district